Mats Wilander was the defending champions, but did not compete this year.

Henrik Sundström won the title by defeating Anders Järryd 3–6, 7–5, 6–3 in the final.

Seeds

Draw

Finals

Top half

Bottom half

References

External links
 Official results archive (ATP)
 Official results archive (ITF)

Men's Singles
Singles